Omid (meaning "Hope") is a male Siberian crane, notable for being the only remaining Siberian crane of the western population (a larger eastern population winters in China). It keeps returning to its wintering grounds in Iran, after flying  each year, since the winter of 2006-2007. It usually spends four months in Fereydunkenar wetland on the Caspian Sea, northern Iran.

See also
 List of individual birds

References

External links
 An Iranian documentary film about Omid, called قصه‌های امید (Tales of Hope)

Individual birds
Individual animals in Iran
Individual wild animals